International Conference on the Great Lakes Region (ICGLR), French: Conférence Internationale sur la Région des Grands Lacs (CIRGL), is an intergovernmental organization of African countries in the African Great Lakes region.

Membership
The organisation consists of the following members:

Co-opted members

Leaders

Executive Secretaries

References

External links
 

International organizations based in Africa
Intergovernmental organizations
Organizations established in 2008
Organisations based in Burundi
African Great Lakes